Christoph Meiners (31 July 1747 – 1 May 1810) was a German racialist, philosopher, historian,  and writer born in Warstade. He supported the polygenist theory of human origins. He was a member of the Göttingen School of History.

Biography
Chistoph Meiners was born in Warstade (now a part of Hemmoor) near Otterndorf. He started at a gymnasium in Bremen in 1763, and was a student at Göttingen from 1767 to 1770. In 1772 he became extraordinary professor, and in 1775 full professor, of Weltweisheit at the University of Göttingen. From 1788 to 1791 he co-edited the anti-Kantian journal Philosophische Bibliothek. He wrote on comparative history and cultural history. He is now known mostly for his critical attitude towards Immanuel Kant, Mary Wollstonecraft and the concept of Enlightenment. He died in Göttingen. He later became the favorite intellectual ancestor of the Nazis.

Polygenism

Meiners was a polygenist: he believed that each race had a separate origin. He was a very early practitioner of scientific racism. Meiners studied the physical, mental and moral characteristics of each race, and built a race hierarchy based on the evidence that was considered common in scientific and anthropological circles at the time. Meiners split mankind into two divisions which he labeled the "beautiful White race" and the "ugly Black race". In Meiners's book The Outline of History of Mankind he claimed that a main characteristic of race is either beauty or ugliness. He viewed only the white race as beautiful. He considered ugly races as inferior, immoral, and animal-like. He claimed that the black ugly peoples are distinct from the white beautiful peoples by their sad lack of virtue and their terrible vices.

According to Meiners:

The more intelligent and noble people are by nature, the more adaptable, sensitive, delicate, and soft is their body; on the other hand, the less they possess the capacity and disposition towards virtue, the more they lack adaptability; and not only that, but the less sensitive are their bodies, the more can they tolerate extreme pain or the rapid alteration of heat and cold; when they are exposed to illnesses, the more rapid their recovery from wounds that would be fatal for more sensitive peoples, and the more they can partake of the worst and most indigestible foods ... without noticeable ill effects.

Meiners claimed the Negro felt less pain than any other race and lacked in emotions. Meiners wrote that the Negro had thick nerves and thus was not sensitive like the other races, he went as far to say that the Negro has “no human, barely any animal feeling” he described a story where a Negro was condemned to death by being burned alive, halfway through the burning the Negro asked to smoke a pipe and smoked it like nothing was happening while he continued to be burned alive. Meiners studied the anatomy of the Negro and came to the conclusion that the Negro have bigger teeth and jaws than any other race, as the Negro are all carnivores. Meiners claimed the skull of the Negro was larger but the brain of the Negro was smaller than any other race. Meiners claimed the Negro was the most unhealthy race on earth because of the Negro's poor diet, mode of living and lack of morals he said.

Meiners also claimed Native Americans were an inferior stock of people. He claimed that Indians cannot adapt to different climates, different types of food or modes of life and that when they are exposed to these new conditions they lapse into a “deadly melancholy”.
Meiners studied the diet of the Indians and said that they can feed off any kind of “foul offal” and that they consume huge amounts of alcohol. According to Meiners the Indians are extremely thick as the Spanish conquerors found out when their blades shattered on them. Meiners also claimed the skin of a Native American is thicker than an ox.

Meiners wrote that the noblest race was the Celts, and they were able to conquer various parts of the world, were more sensitive to heat and cold and their delicacy is shown by the way they are selective about what they eat. Meiners claimed Slavs are an inferior race, "less sensitive and content with eating rough food”; he described stories of Slavs eating poisonous fungi without coming to any harm. He claimed that their medical techniques were also backwards such as the Slavs baking sick people in ovens then making them roll in the snow.

Below the Slavs are the peoples of the Middle East and Asia, all limited in intelligence and of an evil disposition, which goes together with lack of adaptability and insensitivity.

In Meiners large work entitled Researches on the variations in human nature (1815), he studied the sexology of each race and claimed that the African Negroids have unduly strong and perverted sex drives, while only white Europeans have it at appropriately lower levels.

Works

Geschichte des Ursprungs, Fortgangs und Verfalls der Wissenschaften in Griechenland und Rom (1781) two volumes
Geschichte des Luxus der Athenienser von den ältesten Zeiten an bis auf den Tod Philipps von Makedonien  (1782)
Grundriß der Geschichte der Menschheit (1785)
Beschreibung Alter Denkmäler in Allen Theilen Der Erde (1786)
Grundriß der Theorie und Geschichte der schönen Wissenschafften (1787)
Ueber den thierischen Magnetismus (1788)
Aus Briefen über die Schweiz. Reisen im Sommer 1782 und 1788 (1791)
Leben Ulrichs von Hutten (1797)
Lebensbeschreibungen berühmter Männer aus den Zeiten der Wiederherstellung der Wissenschaften (1797) three volumes
Beschreibung einer Reise nach Stuttgart und Strasburg im Herbste 1801 (1803)
 Allgemeine kritische Geschichte der Religionen. 2 vols (1806–7)
Untersuchungen über die Verschiedenheiten der Menschennaturen (1813) four volumes

References

External links
 

1747 births
1810 deaths
18th-century German writers
18th-century German male writers
18th-century philosophers
19th-century German male writers
19th-century German writers
19th-century philosophers
18th-century German historians
German philosophers
People from Cuxhaven (district)
People from the Electorate of Hanover
Proponents of scientific racism